Greatest Hits (originally titled Greatest Hits (To Be Continued)) is the first greatest hits album by American country singer LeAnn Rimes, released in the United States on November 18, 2003, by Curb Records.

Content and release
The album contains 2 new songs: "This Love", which Rimes co-wrote alongside Marc Beeson and Jim Collins and speaks about her love for her then husband, Dean Sheremet, "Last Thing on My Mind", a duet with Irish pop singer Ronan Keating, and included "We Can", which had been previously released as a single for the Legally Blonde 2: Motion Picture Soundtrack. "This Love" was the sole single released from the album.

The album was originally released with a limited edition bonus track and DVD. The limited edition bonus track of "O Holy Night" was used to promote her 2004, What a Wonderful World, holiday album. The limited edition DVD contained three music videos ("Blue", "How Do I Live", and "We Can") and the Music in High Places performance of "Can't Fight the Moonlight". The DVD also contained four twenty-one second sound bites each of which Rimes describes the making of the music videos and her enjoyment of her Music in High Places performance of "Can't Fight the Moonlight".

On August 5, 2014, Greatest Hits was issued as a 2-CD limited edition exclusively to Walmart stores. This limited edition contains Greatest Hits and the dance remix album Dance Like You Don't Give A...Greatest Hits Remixes. This set is the only US physical CD release of the remix album.

Track listing

Personnel

 Tim Akers – keyboards
 Tom Bukovac – electric guitar
 David Campbell – string arrangements, conductor
 Kevin St. Claire – choir
 Lisa Cochran – background vocals
 Perry Coleman – background vocals
 Eric Darken – percussion
 Greg Davies – choir
 Dan Dugmore – steel guitar
 Sheila E. – drums
 Claire Fedoruk – choir
 Amy Fogerson – choir
 Shannon Forrest – drums
 Grant Geiger – choir, choir arrangements
 Greg Geiger – choir
 Grant Gershon – choir
 Stephen Grimm – choir
 Michael Herring – acoustic guitar, soloist
 Marie Hodgson – choir
 Drew Holt – choir
 Dann Huff – electric guitar
 Elton John – vocals on "Written in the Stars"
 Elissa Johnston – choir
 Ronan Keating – vocals on "Last Thing on My Mind"
 Charles Lane – choir
 Shawn Lee – drums, percussion
 Robert Lewis – choir
 The London Session Orchestra – strings
 B. James Lowry – acoustic guitar
 Jerry McPherson – electric guitar
 Wil Malone – string arrangements, conductor
 Dominic Miller – acoustic guitar, electric guitar
 Steve Nathan – keyboards
 Cassandra O'Neal – piano
 Dean Parks – acoustic guitar
 Helene Quintana – choir
 LeAnn Rimes – lead vocals
 Steve Robson – acoustic guitar, keyboards
 Leland Sklar – bass guitar
 Kimberly Swizter – choir
 Rohan Thomas – keyboards
 Michael Thompson – electric guitar, slide guitar
 Patrick Warren – pump organ, synthesizer strings
 Glenn Worf – bass guitar

Charts
Greatest Hits debuted at No. 24 on Billboard 200 with 70,686 copies sold in its first week.

Weekly charts

Year-end chart

Sales

See also 
2003 in music

References 

2003 greatest hits albums
LeAnn Rimes albums
Albums produced by Dann Huff
Curb Records compilation albums
Albums produced by Mike Curb
2003 video albums